Kevin MacDonald (1947–2006) was a Washington DC-based artist best known for his large scale drawings in color pencil. The artist is also known for oil paintings and fine art prints, especially lithography and silkscreen printing.

Life and work
MacDonald received his BA from George Washington University in 1969 and also studied art at the now closed Corcoran School of Art in Washington, DC. In 1992 he taught briefly at the Corcoran and at Montgomery College in Takoma Park, MD. MacDonald served on the board of directors of the Washington Project for the Arts for six years, including two as Board President. 

He was also a long time contributor to Washington Arts Museum's activities.

Public collections 

 Baltimore Museum
 Hirshhorn Museum and Sculpture Garden
 Iowa Museum of Art, Iowa University
 Library of Congress
 Metropolitan Museum of Art
 National Gallery of Art
 National Gallery of Art, Corcoran Legacy Collection
 Smithsonian American Art Museum
 The Phillips Collection
 Zimmerli Museum, Rutgers University
 City of Washington DC, DC Commission on the Arts and Humanities Art Bank

References

External links 
 Kevin MacDonald ARTIST 1946 – 2006, artist's estate website including biographical information and images of artist's work. 

Artists from Washington, D.C.
1947 births
2006 deaths
Painters from Washington, D.C.
George Washington University alumni
Corcoran School of the Arts and Design faculty
Corcoran School of the Arts and Design alumni